Pachyella is a genus of fungi in the family Pezizaceae. It was circumscribed by Jean Louis Émile Boudier in 1907.

References

Pezizaceae
Pezizales genera